Columbus  is a city in and the county seat of Bartholomew County, Indiana, United States. The population was 50,474 at the 2020 census. The relatively small city has provided a unique place for noted Modern architecture and public art, commissioning numerous works since the mid-20th century; the annual program Exhibit Columbus celebrates this legacy. It is the principal city of the Columbus, Indiana metropolitan statistical area, which encompasses all of Bartholomew County. Columbus is the birthplace of former Indiana Governor and former Vice President of the United States, Mike Pence.

Columbus is the headquarters of the engine company Cummins, Inc. in 2004 the city was named as one of "The Ten Most Playful Towns" by Nick Jr. Family Magazine. In the July 2005 edition of GQ magazine, Columbus was named as one of the "62 Reasons to Love Your Country". Columbus won the national contest "America in Bloom" in 2006, and in late 2008, National Geographic Traveler ranked Columbus 11th on its historic destinations list , describing the city as "authentic, unique, and unspoiled."

History
The land developed as Columbus was bought by General John Tipton and Luke Bonesteel in 1820. Tipton built a log cabin on Mount Tipton, a small hill overlooking White River and the surrounding flat, heavily forested and swampy valley. It held wetlands of the river. The town was first known as Tiptona, named in honor of Tipton. The town's name was changed to Columbus on March 20, 1821. Many people believe Tipton was upset by the name change, but no evidence exists to prove this.  Nonetheless, he decided to leave the newly founded town and did not return.  

Tipton was later appointed as the highway commissioner for the State of Indiana and was assigned to building a highway from Indianapolis, Indiana to Louisville, Kentucky. When the road approached Columbus, Tipton constructed the first bypass road ever built; it detoured south around the west side of Columbus en route to Seymour.

Joseph McKinney was the first to plot the town of Columbus, but no date was recorded. Local history books for years said that the land on which Columbus sits was donated by Tipton. But in 2003, Historic Columbus Indiana acquired a deed showing that Tipton had sold the land.

A ferry was established below the confluence of the Flatrock and Driftwood rivers, which form the White River. A village of three or four log cabins developed around the ferry landing, and a store was added in 1821. Later that year, Bartholomew County was organized by an act of the State Legislature and named to honor the famous Hoosier militiaman, General Joseph Bartholomew. Columbus was incorporated on June 28, 1864.

The first railroad in Indiana was constructed to Columbus from Madison, Indiana in 1844. This eventually became the Madison branch of the Pennsylvania Railroad. The railroad fostered the growth of the community into one of the largest in Indiana, and three more railroads reached the city by 1850.

The Crump Theatre in Columbus, built in 1889 by John Crump, is the oldest theater in Indiana Today the building is included within the Columbus Historic District. Before it closed permanently in 2010, it was an all-ages venue with occasional musical performances. 

The Cummins Bookstore began operations it the city in 1892. Until late 2007, when it closed, it was the oldest continually operated bookstore in Indiana.

The Irwin Union Bank building was built in 1954. It was designated as a National Historic Landmark by the National Park Service in 2001 in recognition of its unique architecture. The building consists of a one-story bank structure adjacent to a three-story office annex. A portion of the office annex was built along with the banking hall in 1954. The remaining larger portion, designed by Kevin Roche John Dinkeloo and Associates, was built in 1973. Eero Saarinen designed the bank building with its glazed hall to be set off against the blank background of its three-story brick annex. Two steel and glass vestibule connectors lead from the north side of this structure to the annex. The building was designed to distance the Irwin Union Bank from traditional banking architecture, which mostly echoed imposing, neoclassical style buildings of brick or stone. Tellers were behind iron bars and removed from their customers. Saarinen worked to develop a building that would welcome customers rather than intimidate them.

Economy

Columbus has been home to many manufacturing companies, including Noblitt-Sparks Industries, which built radios under the Arvin brand in the 1930s,  and Arvin Industries, now Meritor, Inc. After merging with Meritor Automotive on July 10, 2000, the headquarters of the newly created ArvinMeritor Industries was established in Troy, Michigan, the home of parent company, Rockwell International. It was announced in February 2011 that the company name would revert to Meritor, Inc. 

Cummins, Inc. is by far the region's largest employer, and the Infotech Park in Columbus accounts for a sizable number of research jobs in the city itself. Just south of Columbus are the North American headquarters of Toyota Material Handling, U.S.A., Inc., the world's largest material handling (forklift) manufacturer. 

Other notable industries include architecture, a discipline for which Columbus is famous worldwide. The late J. Irwin Miller (then president and chairman of Cummins Engine Company) launched the Cummins Foundation, a charitable program that helps subsidize a large number of architectural projects throughout the city by up-and-coming engineers and architects.

Early in the 20th century, Columbus also was home to a number of pioneering car manufacturers, including Reeves, which produced the unusual four-axle Octoauto and the twin rear-axle Sextoauto, both around 1911.

Geography
Columbus is located at  (39.213998, −85.911056). The Driftwood and Flatrock Rivers converge at Columbus to form the East Fork of the White River.

Demographics

2010 census
As of the census of 2010, there were 44,061 people, 17,787 households, and 11,506 families residing in the city. The racial makeup of the city was 86.9% White, 2.7% African American, 0.2% Native American, 5.6% Asian, 0.1% Pacific Islander, 2.5% from other races, and 2.0% from two or more races. Hispanic or Latino of any race were 5.8% of the population.

There were 17,787 households, of which 33.5% had children under the age of 18 living with them, 48.5% were married couples living together, 11.7% had a female householder with no husband present, 4.5% had a male householder with no wife present, and 35.3% were non-families. 29.7% of all households were made up of individuals, and 11.5% had someone living alone who was 65 years of age or older. The average household size was 2.43 and the average family size was 3.00.

The median age in the city was 37.1 years. 25.2% of residents were under the age of 18; 8.1% were between the ages of 18 and 24; 27.3% were from 25 to 44; 24.9% were from 45 to 64; and 14.4% were 65 years of age or older. The gender makeup of the city was 48.4% male and 51.6% female.

2000 census
As of the census of 2000, there were 39,059 people, 15,985 households, and 10,566 families residing in the city. The racial makeup of the city was 91.32% White, 2.71% Black or African American, 0.13% Native American, 3.23% Asian, 0.05% Pacific Islander, 1.39% from other races, and 1.19% from two or more races. 2.81% of the population were Hispanic or Latino of any race.

There were 15,985 households, out of which 31.8% had children under the age of 18 living with them, 51.9% were married couples living together, 11.0% had a female householder with no husband present, and 33.9% were non-families. 29.1% of all households were composed of individuals, and 10.7% had someone living alone who was 65 years of age or older. The average household size was 2.39, and the average family size was 2.94.

In the city, the population was spread out, with 25.7% under the age of 18, 8.0% from 18 to 24 years, 29.5% from 25 to 44 years, 23.0% from 45 to 64 years, and 13.7% over the age of 65. The median age was 36 years. There were 92.8 males for every 100 females and 89.6 males for every 100 females over age 18.

The median income for a household in the city was $41,723, and the median income for a family was $52,296. Males had a median income of $40,367 versus $24,446 for females, and the per capita income was $22,055. About 6.5% of families and 8.1% of the population were below the poverty line, including 9.7% of those under age 18 and 8.8% of those age 65 or over.

Arts and culture

Columbus is a city known for its modern architecture and public art. J. Irwin Miller, 2nd CEO and a nephew of a co-founder of Cummins Inc., the Columbus-headquartered diesel engine manufacturer, instituted a program in which the Cummins Foundation paid the architects' fees, provided the client selected a firm from a list compiled by the foundation. The plan was initiated with public schools and was so successful that the foundation decided to offer such design support to other non-profit and civic organizations. The high number of notable public buildings and public art in the Columbus area, designed by such individuals as Eero Saarinen, I.M. Pei, Robert Venturi, Cesar Pelli, and Richard Meier, led to Columbus earning the nickname "Athens on the Prairie."

Seven buildings, constructed between 1942 and 1965, are National Historic Landmarks, and approximately 60 other buildings sustain the Bartholomew County seat's reputation as a showcase of modern architecture. National Public Radio once devoted an article to the town's architecture.

In 2015, Landmark Columbus was created as a program of Heritage Fund - The Community Foundation of Bartholomew county.

In addition to the Columbus Historic District and Irwin Union Bank, the city has numerous buildings listed on the National Register of Historic Places, including seven National Historic Landmarks of modernist architecture: Bartholomew County Courthouse, Columbus City Hall, First Baptist Church, First Christian Church, Haw Creek Leather Company, Mabel McDowell Elementary School, McEwen-Samuels-Marr House, McKinley School, Miller House, North Christian Church, and The Republic Newspaper Office.

The city is the basis for the 2017 film Columbus by independent filmmaker Kogonada. The film was shot on location in Columbus over 18 days in the summer of 2016.

National Historic Landmarks
 First Baptist Church was designed by Harry Weese without windows and was dedicated in 1965. Its architectural features include a high-pitched roof and skylight.
 First Christian Church was designed by Eliel Saarinen with a 160-ft (49m) tower and was dedicated in 1942. Among the first Modern religious buildings in America, it includes a sunken terrace and a 900-person sanctuary.
 Irwin Union Bank was designed by Eero Saarinen and includes an addition by Kevin Roche. The building was dedicated in 1954 and is possibly the first financial institution in America to use glass walls and an open floor plan.
 The Mabel McDowell School opened in 1960 and was designed by John Carl Warnecke early in his career, using his "early comprehensive diverse approach." The architect fee was the second to be funded by the Cummins Engine Foundation.
 The Miller House and Garden was constructed in 1957 and was designed by Eero Saarinen and landscaped by Dan Kiley. One of the few residential designs by Saarinen, the home is an expression of International Style and was built for J. Irwin Miller of the Cummins Engine corporation and foundation.
 North Christian Church was designed by Eero Saarinen and held its first worship in 1964. The hexagonal-shaped building includes a 192-ft (59m) spire and houses a Holtkamp organ.
 The Republic Newspaper Office was designed by Myron Goldsmith of Skidmore, Owings & Merrill.

Other notable Modern buildings
 St. Bartholomew Catholic Church, by William Browne Jr. and Steven Risting
 Cleo Rogers Memorial Library, by I. M. Pei
 Columbus East High School, by Romaldo Giurgola
 Commons Centre and Mall, by César Pelli
 St. Peter's Lutheran Church, by Gunnar Birkerts
 Lincoln Elementary School, by Gunnar Birkerts
 Otter Creek Golf Course, by Harry Weese
 Fire Station No. 4, by Robert Venturi
Columbus Regional Hospital, by Robert A.M. Stern

Notable historic buildings
 Bartholomew County Courthouse by Isaac Hodgson
 Columbus Power House by Harrison Albright
 The Crump Theatre by Charles Franklin Sparrell

Public art

 Chaos I by Jean Tinguely
 Friendship Way by William A. Johnson, containing an untitled neon sculpture by Cork Marcheschi
 Irwin Gardens at the Inn at Irwin Gardens
 Large Arch by Henry Moore
 2 Arcs de 212.5˚ by Bernar Venet
 Horses by Costantino Nivola
 The Family by Harris Barron
 Yellow Neon Chandelier and Persians by Dale Chihuly
 C by Robert Indiana
 Sermon on the Mount by Loja Saarinen and Eliel Saarinen
 History and Mystery by William T. Wiley
 Exploded Engine by Rudolph de Harak
 Eos by Dessa Kirk

Exhibit Columbus
In May 2016, Landmark Columbus launched Exhibit Columbus as a way to continue the ambitious traditions of the past into the future. Exhibit Columbus features annual programming that alternates between symposium and exhibition years.

Sports
Columbus High School was home to footwear pioneer Chuck Taylor, who played basketball in Columbus before setting out to promote his now famous shoes and the sport of basketball before being inducted into the Naismith Memorial Basketball Hall of Fame.

Two local high schools compete within the state in various sports. Columbus North and Columbus East both have competitive athletics and have many notable athletes that go on to compete in college and beyond. Columbus North High School houses one of the largest high school gyms in the United States. CNHS vs CEHS

Indiana Diesels of the Premier Basketball League play their home games at the gymnasium at Ceraland Park, with plans to move to a proposed downtown sports complex in the near future.

Parks and recreation
These amenities, in addition to several athletic and community facilities, including Donner Aquatic Center, Lincoln Park Softball Complex, Hamilton Center Ice Arena, Clifty Park, Foundation for Youth/Columbus Gymnastics Center and The Commons, are managed and maintained by the Columbus Parks and Recreation Department.

Transportation

Roads and highways
The north-south US Route 31 has been diverted to the northeastern part of the city. Interstate 65 bypasses Columbus to the west. Indiana Route 46 runs-east-west through the southern section of the city.

Railroads
Freight rail service is provided by the Louisville and Indiana Railroad (LIRC). The LIRC line runs in a north–south orientation along the western edge of Columbus.

The Pennsylvania Railroad's Kentuckyian (Chicago-Louisville) made stops in the city until 1968. The PRR and its successor, the Penn Central, ran the Florida-bound South Wind up to 1971.

The city has been earmarked as a location for a new Amtrak station along the Chicago-Indianapolis-Louisville rail corridor.

Airport
Columbus is served by the Columbus Municipal Airport (KBAK). The airport handles approximately 40,500 operations per year, with roughly 87% general aviation, 4% air taxi, 8% military and less than 1% commercial service. The airport has two concrete runways; a 6,401-foot runway with approved ILS and GPS approaches (Runway 5-23) and a 5,001 foot crosswind runway, also with GPS approaches, (Runway 14-32).

Notable people

This is a list of notable people who were born in, or who currently live, or have lived in Columbus.
 Ross Barbour and Don Barbour, singers, The Four Freshmen
Michael Evans Behling, actor
 Kate Bruce, silent-film actress
 Clessie Cummins: inventor, mechanic, salesman, and founder of engine manufacturer Cummins, Inc.
 William H. Donner: businessman, industrialist and philanthropist
 Tyler Duncan: professional golfer
 Dutch Fehring: Major League Baseball player and Purdue coach
 Arthur W Graham III: creator of first fully automatic electronic race timing & scoring system, long-time Indy 500 executive race official
 Lee H. Hamilton: member of U.S. Congress and co-chair of the 9/11 Commission
 Jordan Bryce Hutson: gospel musician
 Jamie Hyneman: former host of MythBusters
 Blair Kiel: Notre Dame and pro football quarterback
 Debbi Lawrence: race walker
 Scott McNealy: chairman and co-founder of Sun Microsystems
 J. Irwin Miller: industrialist
 Mike Moore, Minor League Baseball president
 Jeff Osterhage: television and film actor
 Bob Paris: best-selling author, award-winning public speaker and social change agent, former Mr. Universe
 Greg Pence: U.S. representative since 2019, older brother of Mike Pence
 Mike Pence: 50th Governor of Indiana (2013-2017), 48th Vice President of the United States (2017–2021)
 Mike Phipps: Purdue All-American and #3 draft pick, NFL QB (Browns and Bears)
 Frank Richman: Justice of the Indiana Supreme Court, judge at the Nuremberg trials
 Terry Schmidt: NFL cornerback
 Stephen Sprouse: fashion designer
 Tony Stewart: auto racing champion driver and owner, USAC, 3-time NASCAR Cup Series Champion, owner of NASCAR Team; Stewart Haas Racing – SHR
 Jill Tasker: television and voice actor
 Chuck Taylor: shoe designer/salesman and basketball player/promoter
 Bruce Tinsley: creator of Mallard Fillmore
 Herbert Wright: producer

Education
The Bartholomew Consolidated School Corporation (BCSC) is the local school district. High schools include:
 Columbus East High School
 Columbus North High School

Columbus has a public library, a branch of the Bartholomew County Public Library.

Secondary education includes Indiana University–Purdue University Columbus (IUPUC), an Ivy Tech campus, a Purdue Polytechnic campus, and an Indiana Wesleyan University education center.

See also
 The Republic, daily newspaper based in Columbus
 List of public art in Columbus, Indiana
 Columbus, a 2017 American film set in Columbus, Indiana

References

Sources
 Illustrated Historical Atlas of Bartholomew County, Indiana, 1879 (reprinted by the Bartholomew County Historical Society, 1978)
 2003 History of Bartholomew County, Indiana, Volume II, copyright 2003, by the Bartholomew County Historical Society

Further reading
 Columbus Indiana in Vintage Postcards, by Tamara Stone Iorio, copyright 2005 by Tamara Stone Iorio, published by Arcadia Publishing, 
 "Have you Seen my Town?" by Pamela Dinsmore
 "Images of America: Columbus" by Patricia Mote
 "I Discover Columbus" by William Marsh
 "The Diesel Odyssey of Clessie Cummins" by Lyle Cummins
 "The Engine that Could" by Jeffrey L. Cruikshank and David B. Sicilia
 "Columbus Indiana" by Balthazar Korab
 "A Look at Architecture: Columbus Indiana" by the Visitor's Center
 "People and Places in my Town, Columbus Indiana" by Sylvia Worton
 "Folk Heroes, Heroines, and Hometown Heritage – From Columbus, Indiana's City Hall Murals and Beyond" is about Columbus' outstanding personality beyond its architecture. , by Rose Pelone Sisson

External links

 City of Columbus website
 Columbus Area Visitors Center
 A History of Columbus Indiana
 

 
1820 establishments in Indiana
 
Cities in Indiana
County seats in Indiana
Populated places established in 1820